Kakhaber 'Kakhi' Makharadze (born 20 October 1987) is a Georgian football midfielder who is currently banned.

His father Malkhaz Makharadze (also known as Makho Makharadze) and younger brother Boris Makharadze are also professional footballers.

Career

Lokomotiv Tashkent

He joined Lokomotiv Tashkent in 2009 and, according to a club official site survey, was chosen as the clubs "Best Player of The Year 2009" with 40% of total votes.

Pakhtakor
On 26 February 2011 it was announced that Kakhi Makharadze had signed for Pakhtakor among other new signings for the club. He moved to Pakhtakor from another capital club Lokomotiv Tashkent. He was captain of the club until 2016, when he returned to Lokomotiv.

National team
Makharadze made his official debut in UEFA tournaments as a national player in a match for Georgia U20 against Slovakia U-19 on 18 October 2004. This was won by Georgia with a scoreline of 4–2.

Match fixing
In September 2022, Makharadze was handed a five-year ban for match-fixing after accepting money to fix the Uzbekistan Super League game between his club Lokomotiv Tashkent and Navbahor Namangan in the March 2022.

Honours
Dinamo Tbilisi
Umaglesi Liga: 2004–05
Georgian Super Cup: 2005/2006

Pakhtakor
Uzbek League: 2012, 2014
Uzbekistan Cup: 2011

Individual
 Lokomotiv Tashkent Player of the Year: 2009

References

External links

 
 

1987 births
Living people
Footballers from Georgia (country)
Georgia (country) international footballers
FC Dinamo Tbilisi players
FC Chikhura Sachkhere players
FC Dinamo Batumi players
Pakhtakor Tashkent FK players
PFC Lokomotiv Tashkent players
Uzbekistan Super League players
Expatriate footballers from Georgia (country)
Expatriate footballers in Uzbekistan
Association football midfielders